Cristiano Ronaldo: The World at His Feet is a 2014 Spanish documentary film directed by Tara Pirnia. It follows the life and career of Portuguese footballer Cristiano Ronaldo, who was playing for Spanish club Real Madrid at the time of the documentary's release. It was released via Vimeo in June 2014.

The documentary is narrated by the actor Benedict Cumberbatch.

See also
 Ronaldo (film)

References

External links
 
 
 

2014 films
2014 documentary films
2010s sports films
American sports documentary films
Spanish documentary films
Cristiano Ronaldo
Documentary films about association football
Documentary films about sportspeople
2010s English-language films
2010s American films